Silver Dollar Island is a small island in Summit County, Colorado. It is in the Blue River arm of the Dillon Reservoir, east of the Frisco Peninsula. It appears on a 1970 USGS map of the area, along with Sentinel Island and Fishhook Island. The island is generally accessible by land via a small sand spit.

References

Landforms of Summit County, Colorado
Islands of Colorado